Boulle is a French surname. Notable people with the surname include:

 Jean Boulle, the father of André Charles Boulle, a cabinetmaker to the King of France
 André Charles Boulle (1642–1732), French cabinetmaker to the Sun King
 Jean-Philippe Boulle (1678–1744), French cabinetmaker to the King of France and the oldest son of André-Charles Boulle
 Étienne-Louis Boullée (1728-1799), French neoclassical architect 
 Pierre Boulle (1912–1994), French novelist
 Jean-Raymond Boulle (born 1950), mining entrepreneur, founder and principal shareholder of Titanium Resources Group
 Francis Boulle (born 1988) Comedian, entrepreneur and creator of Made in Chelsea
 Mark Boulle (born 1979), Australian musician

See also 
 Boulle work, marquetry process made famous by the French cabinetmaker André Charles Boulle

French-language surnames